The 1991 Tour de France started with 198 cyclists, divided into 22 teams of 9 cyclists. Sixteen teams qualified by being ranked in the top 16 of the FICP ranking for teams in May 1991:

Teams

Qualified teams

 
 
 
 
 
 
 
 
 
 
 
 
 
 
 
 

Invited teams

 
 
 
 
 
 Tonton Tapis–GB

Cyclists

By starting number

By team

By nationality

Notes

References

1991 Tour de France
1991